Archernis fulvalis is a moth in the family Crambidae. It was described by George Hampson in 1913. It is found in French Polynesia, where it has been recorded from the Society Islands.

Taxonomy
The name Archernis fulvalis is preoccupied by Archernis fulvalis described by Hampson in 1899.

References

Moths described in 1913
Spilomelinae
Moths of Oceania
Controversial taxa